"Diamond Eyes (Boom-Lay Boom-Lay Boom)" is a digital single by Shinedown, written for the 2010 film The Expendables. The song was released on iTunes on June 15, 2010, and to online retailers on June 21, 2010. It is the nineteenth track on the deluxe version of The Sound of Madness. The song was released to U.S. radio on December 7.

In addition to The Expendables, the song was used as the secondary theme for WWE's WrestleMania XXVII event and as WWE Main Event's opening theme from October 3, 2012 to January 22, 2014. It was also used in Formula One's video review for the 2011 Brazilian Grand Prix. In gaming, it is a playable song in Rock Band Blitz and Rock Band 3.

Writing process
On the Carnival of Madness Tour, Shinedown lead singer Brent Smith said this about the song:

Despite this, the song did not make it into the theatrical cut of the film. However, the track eventually made its way into the director's cut, which premiered on various on demand services in April 2011. It plays twice in the extended edition, with the first being during the raid on Garza's compound and the second during the end credits.

Track listing

Music video
The music video for "Diamond Eyes (Boom-Lay Boom-Lay Boom)" was released on December 14, 2010. It features a live performance of the song from the Carnival of Madness Tour, and clips from The Expendables.

Chart performance
In the U.S., the song reached No. 11 on Billboard Bubbling Under Hot 100 Singles, while topping the Mainstream Rock Tracks chart in March 2011.

Charts

Weekly charts

Year-end charts

Certifications

References

2010 singles
Shinedown songs
Songs written by Brent Smith
Songs written by Dave Bassett (songwriter)
2010 songs
Atlantic Records singles
Alternative metal songs